Western Continentals is a Barbershop quartet that won the 1968 SPEBSQSA international competition.

References 
 AIC entry (archived)

Barbershop quartets
Barbershop Harmony Society